Schram City is a small town in Montgomery County, Illinois, United States. The population was 586 at the 2010 census.

Geography

Demographics

As of the census of 2000, there were 700 people, 263 households, and 188 families residing in the village. The racial makeup of the village was 99.08% White, 0.46% African American, 0.15% Native American, 0.15% Asian, and 0.15% from two or more races. Hispanic or Latino of any race were 0.31% of the population.

There were 263 households, out of which 33.1% had children under the age of 18 living with them, 54.0% were married couples living together, 13.3% had a female householder with no husband present, and 28.5% were non-families. 26.2% of all households were made up of individuals, and 15.2% had someone living alone who was 65 years of age or older. The average household size was 2.46 and the average family size was 2.91.

In the village, the population was spread out, with 24.3% under the age of 18, 8.0% from 18 to 24, 28.0% from 25 to 44, 22.8% from 45 to 64, and 16.8% who were 65 years of age or older. The median age was 39 years. For every 100 females, there were 98.5 males. For every 100 females age 18 and over, there were 97.6 males.

The median income for a household in the village was $33,750, and the median income for a family was $41,500. Males had a median income of $31,667 versus $20,625 for females. The per capita income for the village was $16,994. About 4.9% of families and 7.9% of the population were below the poverty line, including 7.1% of those under age 18 and 12.0% of those age 65 or over.

References

External links
Schram City Illinois, Historical Society of Montgomery County Illinois

Villages in Montgomery County, Illinois
Villages in Illinois